This is a list of aircraft of the Royal New Zealand Air Force and Royal New Zealand Navy. For active aircraft see List of active New Zealand military aircraft.

Aircraft

Guided missiles of the RNZAF, RNZN and New Zealand Army

Royal New Zealand Air Force

New Zealand Army

Royal New Zealand Navy

Torpedoes

Homing Torpedoes of the Royal New Zealand Air Force

Unguided Torpedeos of the Royal New Zealand Navy

Homing Torpedoes of the Royal New Zealand Navy

Unmanned aerial vehicles

New Zealand Army

Unguided Rocket Weapons

New Zealand Army

Royal New Zealand Air Force

List of Weapons of the Royal New Zealand Air Force

Free-Fall Bombs
 5-lb Mark 106 practice bomb
 25-lb BDU 33 practice bome
 500-lb (227-kg) Mark 82 bomb – Carried by the A-4G and A-4K Skyhawk
 1000-lb (454-kg) Mark 83 bomb – Carried by the A-4G and A-4K Skyhawk, P-3K Orion

Machine Guns
 7.62-mm FN MAG-58 machine-gun – Current
 7.62-mm M60 machine-gun – Fitted to the UH-1H Iroquois, SH-2F Seasprite and SH-2G Super Seasprite

References

 Aircraft of the Royal New Zealand Air Force. By David Duxbury, Ross Ewing and Ross MacPherson, published by Heinemann Publishers (NZ), Auckland 1987, .
 The Oxford Companion To New Zealand Military History. Edited by Ian McGibbon, published by Oxford University Press (NZ), Auckland 2000, .

New Zealand
Royal New Zealand Air Force
Royal New Zealand Navy
New Zealand military aircraft
New Zealand military-related lists